Sabah Shariati (born in Sanandaj, Kurdistan province, Iran) is an Iranian-born naturalized Azerbaijani Greco-Roman wrestler. He won bronze in the 2016 Rio Olympics, losing to eventual silver medalist and 4 time world champion Riza Kayaalp of Turkey.

He competed in the 130kg event at the 2022 World Wrestling Championships held in Belgrade, Serbia.

Career in Iran 
He won an Iranian national youth medal in 2005 freestyle competitions. Representing Iran, in 2009 he won the 120 kg Greco Roman gold medal in Baku's international tournament.

References

External links
 Sabah Shariati at rio2016.com

http://www.instagram.com/irani.lion/

Living people
Iranian male sport wrestlers
Wrestlers at the 2016 Summer Olympics
Azerbaijani male sport wrestlers
Olympic wrestlers of Azerbaijan
People from Sanandaj
Kurdish sportspeople
Olympic competitors from Iran who represented other countries
Olympic bronze medalists for Azerbaijan
Olympic medalists in wrestling
Medalists at the 2016 Summer Olympics
Naturalized citizens of Azerbaijan
1989 births
Iranian emigrants to Azerbaijan
Wrestlers at the 2015 European Games
Wrestlers at the 2019 European Games
European Games medalists in wrestling
European Games silver medalists for Azerbaijan
European Games bronze medalists for Azerbaijan
European Wrestling Championships medalists
Islamic Solidarity Games medalists in wrestling
Islamic Solidarity Games competitors for Azerbaijan